Hilderstone is a village and a civil parish in the English county of Staffordshire.

Location 
The village is situate on the B 5066. The nearest main roads are the A520 which passes the village  to the west.

Population 
The 2011 census recorded a population of 641 in 235 Households. The parish comes under the Stafford Non-Metropolitan District.

History

Etymology 

The genesis of the village name are said to be of Saxon origin. The name Heldulvestone and its variant are of Saxon derivation. The origin of Hilderstone is Hildewulf's ton meaning a warrior wolf and ton a place or town. Thus Hilderstone was the place of the warrior wolf.

Domesday Book 

Hilderstone is recorded in the Domesday Book of 1086. In the survey the village has the name  Heldulvestone In the survey the settlement was described as quite small with only 6 households. Other Assets included 2 villager or villein, meadow of 1 acres, 2 smallholders and 2 slave. There was also 3 ploughlands (land for), 1 lord's plough teams, 1 men's plough teams. In 1066 the lord of the manor was held by Wulfric Dunning. In 1086 the lord of the manor was held by Vitalis of Hilderstone. The Tenant-in-chief in 1086 was Robert of Stafford.

Buildings and structures 
There are 15 listed buildings and structures within the parish. This includes a K6 Telephone Box designed in 1935 by Sir Giles Gilbert Scott. All of these structures have been designated a Grade II listing.

Listed buildings in Hilderstone

The parish church of Christ Church 

The Grade II listed parish church of Christ Church
began construction in 1829 with the laying of a foundation stone. The church was designed by Thomas Trubshaw (1802–42) and was built using a local stone called Hollington stone. Trubshaw was a son of James Trubshaw, the head of a Staffordshire family of masons and church builders who had been involved in church building for many years. This church was designed and built in the gothic style. Around the outside eaves of the church there are carved gargoyles which are said to depict the workmen involved in the building of the church. The church was completed in 1833 and opened on 31 July of that year.

Moated site
It relates to a former house for which records go back to the 13th century, predating the hall which was built in 1730. A fishpond, associated with the moated house, is immediately south-east. They are a scheduled monument.

Notable people 

 Richard Gerard of Hilderstone (1635-1680) a victim of the Popish Plot of the reign of Charles II. He was a Roman Catholic and came forward as a witness in the defence of the accused Catholic aristocrat, William Howard, 1st Viscount Stafford, which led to his own death in prison, although he had never been brought to trial.

References 

Villages in Staffordshire